K Neelima Chowdary is an Indian badminton player who represented India in many international games and championships.

Early life 
Chowdary was born in Andhra Pradesh, India on 15 September 1977. She belongs to the Kammas community of the state.

Career 
She started training in Vijayawada under the guidance of Sports Authority of India  appointed coach P.U. Bhaskar Babu.

Chowdary started her Badminton career in 1992 playing India's Individual Junior Championships and won the first place in women's doubles category. PVV Lakshmi and Chowdary emerged as top seeded player from that championship.

The winning streak continued in 1994 when Chowdary along with Nirmala Kotnis won India's Individual Junior Championships.

In the game of mixed doubles in 1995, Chowdary along with Sameer Mahesh, won India's Individual Junior Championships. In 1996, Chowdary and Sudha Rani went on to secure the first place in the India's Individual Junior Championships. Playing singles in the International Championships in 1997, Chowdary finished at the fifth spot. The same year Manjusha Kanwar and Chowdary fished fifth in the women's doubles International Championships.

In 1998, Chowdary bagged a silver in while playing singles at the Sri Lanka International Championship. She also represented Indian women team in the 1998 Commonwealth Games and won a bronze.  In 2001, Chowdary won the 66th Indian National Badminton Championships while playing women's doubles with D Swetha. This was the year, the All England champion P. Gopichand led the Andhra Pradesh teams for the badminton events of the National Games at the Hansraj Stadium, Jalandhar, Punjab.

In 2002, Chowdary and Cha Deepti played doubles at the 17th Commonwealth Games against Seychelles Island and won the match.

In March 2017, Chowdary participated in the 41st Indian Masters (Veteran) National Badminton Championship Cochin, Kerala. In the 35 plus mixed doubles, Chowdary and Abhinand Shetty played and won against Dhole and Prerana Joshi.

Achievements

IBF International

References

External links
 

1977 births
Living people
Indian female badminton players
Indian national badminton champions
Racket sportspeople from Andhra Pradesh
Sportswomen from Andhra Pradesh
20th-century Indian women
20th-century Indian people
Commonwealth Games bronze medallists for India
Commonwealth Games medallists in badminton
Badminton players at the 1998 Commonwealth Games
Medallists at the 1998 Commonwealth Games